She's All That is a 1999 American teen romantic comedy film directed by Robert Iscove. It stars Freddie Prinze Jr., Rachael Leigh Cook, Matthew Lillard, and Paul Walker. After being dumped by his girlfriend, Zack Siler boasts he could make any girl at his high school popular. It is a modern adaptation of George Bernard Shaw's play Pygmalion and George Cukor's 1964 film My Fair Lady.

The film received mixed reviews from critics, who praised the performances of the lead actors, but were critical of the script. It was one of the most popular teen films of the late 1990s and reached No. 1 at the box office in its first week of release. It went on to earn $103 million worldwide. After featuring in the film, the song "Kiss Me" reached No. 2 on Billboard'''s Hot 100 and stayed in the Top 10 for 16 weeks. A gender-swapped remake, titled He's All That, was released on August 27, 2021 by Netflix.

 Plot 

Zack Siler is the big man on campus at his Southern California high school. After returning from spring break, he finds out his girlfriend, Taylor, has cheated on him with a reality TV star, Brock. After Zack and Taylor's breakup, Zack consoles himself by claiming that Taylor is replaceable with any girl in the school. Zack's friend Dean disagrees and bets Zack to turn any random girl from school into the prom queen in six weeks. Zack accepts. Dean chooses Laney Boggs, an awkward and unpopular art student.

Zack attempts to befriend Laney, but she pointedly ignores his advances until he asks for her help with art. She reluctantly invites him to a small theater lounge where she will perform. Intending to deter him, Laney volunteers Zack to perform onstage. Zack manages to improvise a routine with his hacky sack. Laney is impressed but still rejects him when he attempts to charm her again.

When Zack shows up at her house, Laney reluctantly agrees to go to the beach with him and his friends, and they invite her to a party later. Laney says she's busy, but Zack persuades her to go. He enlists his sister, Mack, to give her a makeover. At the party, Taylor, who is embarrassed by Brock and jealous of Laney, publicly humiliates Laney and brings her to tears.

Laney is surprised to be nominated for prom queen, along with Taylor. Zack then goes by Laney's house and asks about her mother, who died when Laney was young, and talks about his father, who is pressuring him to go to Dartmouth for college. Zack leans in to kiss Laney but pulls back when she jokes that it is just to get her vote for prom king.

The next day, Zack defends Laney's brother, Simon, from bullies in the cafeteria. After a falling out with Zack, Dean asks Laney to be his prom date. Taylor is humiliated when Brock dumps her, so she cozies up to Zack. When Zack turns her down, she tells him that Dean has already asked Laney to the prom. When Zack confronts him, Dean reveals the bet, forcing a public confession from Zack. A furious Laney rushes from the room, refusing to speak to Zack.

Unable to reconcile with Laney, Zack takes his sister to the prom. After some persuading from her father, a disheartened Laney agrees to go with Dean. At the dance, Dean boasts of his plan to seduce Laney. Laney's friend Jesse overhears, and he and Mack rush to warn Zack, who has taken the stage with Taylor as Prom King and Queen. Zack rushes after Laney, who has already left with Dean.

Laney returns home to find Zack is there. Laney explains how she avoided Dean's advances. Zack confesses his true feelings, and they share a dance and kiss by the pool. Laney asks Zack about the bet, and he says mysteriously he will honor the terms. On the day of graduation he appears onstage nude except for cap and a soccer ball, to applause from the crowd and smiles from Laney.

 Cast 

 Production 

 Casting 

The film had an ensemble cast of up-and-coming actors, including Kieran Culkin, Oscar winner Anna Paquin, Jodi Lyn O'Keefe, musician Usher Raymond, Gabrielle Union in her film debut, Dulé Hill, and Lil' Kim. Producer Richard N. Gladstein noted, "There were other films that you could've seen them in, but they weren't usually the leads in those films." According to director Robert Iscove, Miramax co-head Harvey Weinstein was very involved in script development and casting, and was able to get great actors in very small parts as a personal favor.

Iscove said Josh Hartnett was considered for the role of Zack Siler, and many actresses were considered for the role of Laney Boggs, including Mena Suvari, Leelee Sobieski, and Jordana Brewster.

Kevin Pollak said he signed up for the movie in part because he was impressed with Freddie Prinze Jr.’s performance in The House of Yes a few years earlier and was interested in working with him.

 Writing 

R. Lee Fleming Jr. is officially credited as the sole screenwriter for the film. In a 2002 interview, M. Night Shyamalan stated that he polished the screenplay while adapting Stuart Little and writing a spec script for The Sixth Sense. This was also confirmed in the film's audio commentary by Iscove.

In 2013, Shyamalan claimed that, rather than simply polishing Fleming's original script, he actually ghost-wrote the film. This was disputed by Fleming.  Jack Lechner (who served as Miramax's head of development in the late 1990s) confirmed that technically both Shyamalan and Fleming contributed to the script: Fleming wrote the initial script that Miramax bought, while Shyamalan did an uncredited rewrite (doing more than "a polish") that got the film green-lit. Lechner reiterated that content from both writers was included in the final cut of the film. Producer Richard N. Gladstein said that the script "was pretty much done" already, but that Shyamalan's changes "helped enormously with the relationship with Kevin Pollak [who played Laney's father, Wayne]". Iscove attributed the performance art piece and the hacky sack sequence to Shyamalan. Fleming attributed the line "Am I a fucking bet?" to Shyamalan. Fleming included various pop culture references in his script: Laney Boggs was named after two characters played by Winona Ryder, Kim Boggs from Edward Scissorhands and Laney Pierce from Reality Bites; the characters Zack and Taylor were named after two of the three members of the band Hanson. Pollak constantly guessing Jeopardy answers incorrectly is a running joke, which he previously did in the 1997 film Truth or Consequences, N.M.. The idea was in Fleming's script but Pollak expanded and improvised his answers.

Iscove was influenced by the movies of John Hughes and was trying do something different for the '90s generation that would still resonate. He stressed the importance of the story having a heart, how Zack had to be worthy of Laney, and how Laney had to learn to be more open. The story was rewritten to better fit Prinze Jr. and make Zack a more sympathetic character with his own challenges. Iscove was well aware that it was implausible to suggest Rachael Leigh Cook was ugly, but said it was standard practice in Hollywood to cast "the beautiful girl" and that it requires the audience to suspend their disbelief: "You either go along with it or you don't go along with it." Comparing Laney’s transformation to that of Clark Kent into Superman, Iscove said casting the role was more about finding an actor who had the range to give the necessary performance.

 Filming 

Filming took place in 6 August 1998 to 28 September 1998 various California locations. The high school scenes were shot at Torrance High School, where television series Buffy the Vampire Slayer and Beverly Hills, 90210 were previously filmed.

Iscove was also a choreographer and wanted to expand and embellish the prom scenes, while also showing the Weinsteins how musical numbers could work in films. The dance scene was choreographed by Adam Shankman at the request of the film’s co-producer Jennifer Gibgot, who is Shankman’s sister. Shankman was assisted by Anne Fletcher. Shankman was concerned about the scene not tonally meshing with the rest of the film, but Iscove persisted. Test audiences didn't understand why the dance scene was happening, so Bob Weinstein asked for a reshoot with Usher to link the scene. Shankman also worked with Matthew Lillard on his solo dance scenes.

Costume designer Denise Wingate said, "We had no budget so we had to be really creative—everything in that prom scene was white, black, and gold, and we got it all from The Salvation Army and just completely reworked it." Having majored in psychology, Wingate tried to explore the possible reasons for the characters’ wardrobe. Wingate concluded that Laney wore clothes like armor after the death of her mother, but also wanted to express herself as an artist, resulting in a mix of vintage clothes, overalls, aprons, and various quirky t-shirts. The falafel restaurant hat was created on short notice with items picked up from a Michaels craft store. Laney's transformation was reflected in the red dress, which demonstrated "a bold statement of her dressing in a color that was so different than anything we’d seen her in before." Leigh Cook recalled "feeling really self-conscious” in the scene where she first descends the stairs in the dress. There were two versions of the red dress: a stunt double dress reserved for the scene when Laney falls down in a driveway outside a party, and a second smaller dress, which left Cook holding her breath trying to get through the scene quickly.

 Soundtrack 
The song "Kiss Me" was used as the main theme song. The film's box office success helped "Kiss Me" to gain widespread mainstream attention and chart success. It climbed to No. 2 on Billboard's Hot 100 list, and stayed in the Top 10 for 16 straight weeks and No. 4 in the UK and New Zealand.

 Reception 
 Critical response 
On review aggregator Rotten Tomatoes, the film has an approval rating of 41% based on 63 reviews, with an average rating of 5/10. The website's critics consensus states: "Despite its charming young leads, She's All That can't overcome its predictable, inconsistently funny script." On Metacritic, the film has a weighted average score of 51 out of 100, based on 32 critics, indicating "mixed or average reviews".

It was the last movie to be reviewed by Gene Siskel before his death in February 1999. Siskel gave a positive review and wrote, "Rachael Leigh Cook, as Laney, the plain Jane object of the makeover, is forced to demonstrate the biggest emotional range as a character, and she is equal to the assignment." Roger Ebert suggested: "To give the movie credit, it's as bored with the underlying plot as we are. Even the prom queen election is only a backdrop for more interesting material, as She's All That explores differences in class and style, and peppers its screenplay with very funny little moments." Ebert says it "is not a great movie, but it has its moments", giving it 2.5 out of 4 stars. Stephen Holden of the New York Times praised Cook for her performance, comparing her to Winona Ryder, saying, "Unlike so many actors playing smart young people, she actually projects some intelligence along with a sly sense of comedy."

Mick LaSalle of the San Francisco Chronicle calls it "About one idea short of being an excellent teenage romance. As it stands it's a pleasing but routine effort." LaSalle criticized the film for running out of plot about halfway, saying the "story line is stretched to the breaking point. In one instance, director Robert Iscove stops the action for a long dance sequence, set at the prom, that has nothing to do with anything." He commented the film is "intermittently funny" and praised Matthew Lillard's performance, calling it the best thing in the picture.

Geoff Berkshire Variety magazine was critical of the lack of originality and suggested that "Miramax needs to put Kevin Williamson on permanent retainer if it's going to remain in the teen-pics field, She's All That notably fails to bring to comedy the insight that the Williamson-penned Scream brought so memorably to horror". Berkshire was positive about the two leads, saying "appealing young actors come off as competent, nothing more, given a context that can't be transcended." He described the direction as "nothing to be ashamed of here, but nothing of any distinction, either", and noted the soundtrack as a not unexpected plus.
Jane Ganahl of the San Francisco Examiner wrote, "And once, just once, I'd love to see a teen flick that doesn't send out a message to young girls that to be acceptable, you have to conform. I liked the artist girl much better before."

William Thomas of Empire criticized the film, saying that despite a few scenes, "The rest is just breezy propaganda for American high school fascism", and "The most worrying thing about She's All That is its message. The 'ugly duckling' (specs, dungarees, art-lover) must conform (she gets a makeover and the boys notice her "bobos" for the first time) to fit in."

 Box office She's All That premiered on January 19, 1999 at the Mann Festival Theater in Westwood, Los Angeles. The film went into general release on January 29.

The film was released in Italy with the title "Kiss Me".

The film reached No. 1 at the box office in the first week of its release, grossing $16.1 million over the Super Bowl opening weekend. It earned $63.4 million in the United States and $39.8 million at international box offices, totaling $103.2 million worldwide against a production budget between $7–10 million. Miramax spent a further  $18 million  on television advertising to promote the film.

 Accolades 
 
The film won eight awards, and was nominated for five others.

 Remake 

In September 2020, a gender-swapped remake of the film was announced, titled He's All That, with Mark Waters to direct, original screenwriter R. Lee Fleming Jr. to write, and starring Addison Rae and Tanner Buchanan. Myra Molloy, Madison Pettis, Peyton Meyer, Isabella Crovetti, and Annie Jacob have all been cast since.

In December 2020, Rachael Leigh Cook joined the cast to portray Rae's character's mother. It has been confirmed that Cook's character is unrelated to her original character. He's All That'' was released on August 27, 2021, by Netflix.

Notes

References

External links 

 
 
 
 
 

1999 films
1999 romantic comedy films
1990s American films
1990s English-language films
1990s high school films
1990s teen comedy films
1990s teen romance films
American high school films
American romantic comedy films
American teen comedy films
American teen romance films
Films about disability
Films about pranks
Films about proms
Films directed by Robert Iscove
Films scored by Stewart Copeland
Films set in California
Films shot in Los Angeles
Miramax films
Works by R. Lee Fleming Jr.